Since the passage of Florida's Parental Rights in Education Act, known by its critics as the Don't Say Gay Bill or Don't Say Gay Law, The Walt Disney Company has been involved in a feud with Florida governor Ron DeSantis and the state's Republican Party. While initially a donor to some of the politicians who voted in favor of the Act, after its passage, Disney has since spoken out against the bill and called for it to be repealed.

The Parental Rights in Education Act's provisions prohibit classroom instruction on sexual orientation or gender identity from kindergarten to 3rd grade in Florida public school districts, or instruction on sexual orientation and gender identity in a manner that is not "age appropriate or developmentally appropriate for students" in any grade. Parents and teachers can sue a school district if they believe the policy is being violated. In late February 2022, the Orlando Sentinel reported that The Walt Disney Company had previously made campaign contributions to the bill's sponsors.

On March 7, 2022, Disney CEO Bob Chapek declared that the company would not take a public stance on the bill and would instead focus on effecting change through the commercial content it produces. However, many individuals associated with Disney spoke out against its stance. Some Pixar employees revealed that, despite Chapek's statement, Disney had previously removed references to LGBT themes from the studio's films. Following the controversy, Disney reinstated a same-sex kiss in Pixar's 2022 film Lightyear, hosted a town hall meeting to discuss the bill's impact on company employees and their families, and promised to challenge the bill.

Background

On February 24, 2022, the Florida House of Representatives passed the Parental Rights in Education Act with 69 in favor and 47 against. Commonly referred to as the "Don't Say Gay" bill by its opponents, it prevents public schools from holding discussions on sexual orientation and gender identity, stating that lessons "may not occur in kindergarten through grade 3 or in a manner that is not age-appropriate or developmentally appropriate for students in accordance with state standards". The latter passage has been criticized for its vague language, as it "could be interpreted to extend to all grade levels", and potentially forbid students from discussing their lives within a classroom setting. The bill will also allow parents to sue teachers or schools for engaging with these topics. On March 8, the bill passed the Florida Senate and was signed by the governor, Ron DeSantis, on March 28.

The Orlando Sentinel reported in February 2022 that The Walt Disney Company has donated money to all of the bill's sponsors and cosponsors, with The Verge reporting that the donations have totaled around $200,000. On March 7, Disney CEO Bob Chapek released an internal statement proclaiming the company would stand by its LGBT employees, but it would not be taking a public stance either condemning or supporting the bill. According to Chapek, Disney can have its biggest impact in "creating a more inclusive world [...] through the inspiring content [the company] produce[s]".

A day after the bill passed, Chapek condemned the legislation and offered a donation of $5 million to the LGBT advocacy group Human Rights Campaign (HRC), which was refused by the organization until further action against anti-LGBT legislation was taken; however, HRC did acknowledge that the donation was a first step.

Criticism of Disney
Disney's actions of donating money to the bill's sponsors drew criticism from various organizations and individuals associated with the company. Among the first to speak out against Disney's actions was Dana Terrace; the creator of the Disney Channel series The Owl House, who criticized Disney's decision. Other individuals that would go on to denounce Disney's and Chapek's stance include DuckTales  writer Benjamin Siemon, Walt Disney's grandniece Abigail Disney, Agents of S.H.I.E.L.D. producer Drew Z. Greenberg, The Ghost and Molly McGee  creator Bill Motz, and Andi Mack star Lilan Bowden. In response to the bill's passage and Disney's stance, Terrace held a live charity stream on March 13, 2022, with the proceeds going to LGBT organizations; the charity raised $70,000 for the Zebra Coalition.

Many of Disney's subsidiaries have denounced the bill and the company's stance. A statement attributed to "the LGBTQIA+ employees of Pixar, and their allies" was released, where it is stated that "beautiful stories, full of diverse characters, come back from Disney corporate reviews shaved down to crumbs of what they once were". They further criticized Chapek's statement about the biggest impact Disney can have being through its inclusive content, by revealing that "nearly every moment of overtly gay affection is cut at Disney’s behest, regardless of when there is protest from both the creative teams and executive leadership at Pixar". Marvel Studios also "denounce[d] any and ALL legislation that infringes on the basic human rights of the LGBTQIA+ community".

In response to Disney's stance, many employees planned to stage 15-minute digital walkouts starting on March 16, culminating with a day-long walkout on March 22. In an open letter, Disney's response was criticized for having "utterly failed to match the magnitude of the threat to LGBTQIA+ safety represented by [the bill]", as well as failing to integrate diversity, equity, and inclusion as one of its core values, despite claiming to do so. The protest organizers set up a website including a list of "demands for [Disney] to take to regain the trust of the LGBTQIA+ community and employees", such as the company ceasing donations to politicians that helped create and pass the bill. Another demand is for Disney to create an in-house brand that focuses on "LGBTQ+ creators and underrepresented voices", similarly to The Onyx Collective, which focuses on creators of color.

In response to Disney's changed stance on the bill, Laura Ingraham, an American conservative television host, and Sean Feucht, an American Christian singer, songwriter, were critical of the company, claiming its actions "sexualized" children, with Feucht even holding rallies outside the headquarters of the Walt Disney Studios in Burbank, California and Disneyland in Anaheim. Christopher Rufo, American conservative activist, also said that he and other conservatives are waging a "moral war against Disney" and declared that their actions aim to target the company's "public reputation." Additionally, The Daily Wire, a conservative publication, announced a plan to invest $100 million over a three-year period in a streaming platform with live-action and animated content for children to draw in some of those who watched Disney programs. Some argued that the current criticism by such individuals and groups has "strong echoes" of anti-Disney protests by religious leaders in the late 1990s.

Response from Disney
In response to the controversy surrounding Disney's involvement in the bill, the company reinstated a previously deleted kiss between two female characters in Pixar's then upcoming film Lightyear.

Disney hosted a town hall meeting on March 21 to discuss the subject with company employees, specifically the impact it can have on them and their families. The company plans to relocate around 2,000 workers from California to Florida. The meeting is part of the Reimagine Tomorrow campaign, which aims to promote diversity and inclusion at Disney. General Entertainment content president Karey Burke stated that Disney intends to produce content with "many LGBTQIA characters" in the future.

After DeSantis signed the bill, Disney released a statement that its goal is for the law to be repealed or struck down. Disney also paused their contributions to Florida political campaigns as they assessed their "approach to advocacy, including political giving in Florida."

Response from state government

In response to Disney’s announcement of opposition to the law, DeSantis and Florida lawmakers threatened to repeal the 1967 Reedy Creek Improvement Act, which established the area surrounding the Walt Disney World Resort, the Reedy Creek Improvement District, as its own governmental authority which has same authority and responsibilities as a county government without burdening the Floridian tax payer. The repeal of this act would result in the dissolution of the Reedy Creek Improvement District and mean that the infrastructure and municipal services surrounding Walt Disney World would be absorbed by other neighbouring counties, including the estimated $1 billion in debt.

On April 19, 2022, DeSantis extended the scope of a special legislative session regarding congressional redistricting to include examination of consideration of special districts like Reedy Creek. Republican Representative Randy Fine filed House Bill 3-C that would dissolve any "special independent district" established before the November 5, 1968, ratification of the Constitution of Florida. The dissolution would occur on June 1, 2023, and any districts that wished to be re-established could do so via the process in existing law. Rep. Fine claimed that the measure would only impact five districts in the state of Florida and that the Reedy Creek district was the only one involving a "high-profile" corporation. The South Florida Sun Sentinel reported that Fine has a love-hate relationship with Disney, noting that after Walt Disney World re-opened after COVID-19 shutdowns in Florida, he described the theme park as an "engine of our economy."

Also on April 19, Republican State Senator Jennifer Bradley filed two bills: an identical bill to House Bill 3-C in the Florida State Senate, Senate Bill 4-C, and Senate Bill 6-C, which eliminates the exemption to Florida's 2021 anti-deplatforming Senate Bill 7072 for any owners of "theme park or entertainment complexes." At the time, the exemption was added to exclude Disney+'s service from the regulations. The Tampa Bay Times reported that the staff of DeSantis helped write the exemption included in the 2021 bill. In July 2021, Judge Robert Hinkle of the U.S. District Court for the Northern District of Florida put the law on hold arguing it compels "providers to host speech that violates their standards" and described it as a restriction on the First Amendment.

On April 20, 2022, the Florida State Senate passed Senate Bill 4-C, by a vote of 23–16 and Senate Bill 6-C, by a vote of 24–15. It was then sent to the Florida House of Representatives for approval. The House of Representatives approved the bill on April 21 by a vote of 70–38. On April 22, DeSantis signed the bill into law, claiming at a press conference that "we have everything thought out" and that Disney would pay "more taxes" as a result of the repeal effort.

In May 2022, U.S. Senator Josh Hawley (R-MO) introduced a bill that would roll back the copyright term for new works to match to match the Copyright Act of 1909, which grants 28 years of protection that can be renewed for another 28 years. The bill also applies retroactively to works by a group of large companies specifically designed to target Disney. Sarah Jeong of The Verge criticized the bill for obviously violating international copyright agreements and the Fifth Amendment protections against eminent domain, as an attempt to punish Disney for opposing the Parental Rights in Education Act, and because it would not pass in a Congress where both houses were controlled by the Democratic Party.

See also
 Disney and LGBT representation in animation
 Florida Parental Rights in Education Act
 Reedy Creek Improvement Act

References

Ron DeSantis
2022 controversies
2022 controversies in the United States
2022 in American law
2022 in Florida
2022 in LGBT history
Disney
Disney controversies
Florida law
LGBT in Florida
LGBT-related controversies in the United States
Mass media-related controversies in the United States